The 6th arrondissement of Lyon is one of the nine arrondissements of the City of Lyon and one of the poshest.

Geography 
This zone is served by the metro lines ,  and Tramway T3.

Quarters
 Les Brotteaux

Streets and squares
 Boulevard des Belges
 Rue de Créqui
 Rue Duguesclin
 Rue Garibaldi
 Rue Tronchet
 Rue de Vendôme

Monuments 
 Église Saint-Pothin
 Gare des Brotteaux

Cultural activities 
 Musée d'art contemporain de Lyon

See also 
 Cité Internationale

References

External links 

 Official website
 History of the streets of Lyon